Vicente Tuñacao (born 3 April 1925) was a Filipino boxer. He competed in the men's welterweight event at the 1952 Summer Olympics.

References

External links
 

1925 births
Possibly living people
Filipino male boxers
Olympic boxers of the Philippines
Boxers at the 1952 Summer Olympics
Place of birth missing
Asian Games medalists in boxing
Boxers at the 1954 Asian Games
Asian Games gold medalists for the Philippines
Medalists at the 1954 Asian Games
Welterweight boxers